The 1993 Western Athletic Conference men's basketball tournament was held March 10–13 at the Delta Center in Salt Lake City, Utah. This was the first WAC tournament not held on a campus arena.

New Mexico defeated  in the championship game, 76–65, to clinch their first WAC men's tournament championship.

The Lobos, in turn, received an automatic bid to the 1993 NCAA tournament. They were joined in the tournament by the conference's regular season co-champions, Utah and BYU, who received at-large bids to the tournament.

Format
With the addition of Fresno State to the WAC in 1993, the conference's total membership expanded to ten teams. In turn, the tournament field expanded to once again feature all WAC members. The top six teams received byes into the Quarterfinal round, leaving the lowest four-seeded teams to play in the First Round. Like before, teams were seeded based on regular season conference records.

Bracket

References

WAC men's basketball tournament
Tournament
WAC men's basketball tournament
WAC men's basketball tournament